The Patterson power cell is an electrolysis device invented by chemist James A. Patterson, which he said created 200 times more energy than it used, and neutralize radioactivity without emitting any harmful radiation. It is one of several cells that some observers classified as cold fusion; cells which were the subject of an intense scientific controversy in 1989, before being discredited in the eyes of mainstream science.

The Patterson power cell is given little credence by scientists. Physicist Robert L. Park describes the device as fringe science in his book Voodoo Science.

Construction

The cell has a non-conductive housing. The cathode is composed of thousands of sub-millimeter microspheres (co-polymer beads), with a flash coat of copper and multiple layers of electrolytically deposited thin film (650 Angstrom) nickel and palladium. The beads are submerged in water with a lithium sulfate (Li2SO4) electrolyte solution.

Company formed
In 1995, Clean Energy Technologies Inc. was formed to produce and promote the power cell.

Claims and observations

Patterson variously said it produced a hundred or two hundred times more power than it used. Clean Energy Technologies, Inc. (CETI) representatives promoting the device at the Power-Gen '95 Conference said that an input of 1 watt would generate more than 1,000 watts of excess heat. This supposedly happens as hydrogen or deuterium nuclei fuse together to produce heat through a form of low energy nuclear reaction. The byproducts of nuclear fusion, e.g. a tritium nucleus and a proton or an 3He nucleus and a neutron, have not been detected in a reliable way, leading a vast majority of experts to think that no such fusion is taking place.

It is further claimed that if radioactive isotopes such as uranium are present, the cell enables the hydrogen nuclei to fuse with these isotopes, transforming them into stable elements and thus neutralizing the radioactivity; and this would be achieved without releasing any radiation to the environment and without expending any energy. A televised demonstration on June 11, 1997, on Good Morning America was not conclusive because there was no measurement of the radioactivity of the beads after the test, thus it cannot be discarded that the beads had simply absorbed the uranium ions and become radioactive themselves. In 2002, the neutralization of radioactive isotopes has only been achieved through intense neutron bombardment in a nuclear reactor or large scale high energy particle accelerator, and at a large expense of energy.

When asked about reliability in 1998, Gabe Collins, a chemical engineer at CETI, stated: "When they don't work, it's mostly due to contamination. If you get any sodium in the system it kills the reaction – and since sodium is one of the more abundant elements, it's hard to keep it out."

Patterson has carefully distanced himself from the work of Fleischmann and Pons and from the label of "cold fusion", due to the negative connotations associated to them since 1989. Ultimately, this effort was unsuccessful, and not only did it inherit the label of pathological science, but it managed to make cold fusion look a little more pathological in the public eye. Some cold fusion proponents view the cell as a confirmation of their work, while critics see it as "the fringe of the fringe of cold fusion research", since it attempts to commercialize cold fusion on top of making bad science.

In 2002, John R. Huizenga, professor of nuclear chemistry at the University of Rochester, who was head of a government panel convened in 1989 to investigate the cold fusion claims of Fleischmann and Pons, and who wrote a book about the controversy, said "I would be willing to bet there's nothing to it", when asked about the Patterson Power Cell.

In 2006, Hideo Kozima, professor emeritus of physics at Shizuoka University, has suggested that the byproducts are consistent with cold fusion.

Replications
George H. Miley is a professor of nuclear engineering and a cold fusion researcher who claims to have replicated the Patterson Power Cell. During the 2011 World Green Energy Symposium, Miley stated that his device continuously produces several hundred watts of power. Earlier results by Miley have not convinced mainstream researchers, who believe that they can be explained by contamination or by misinterpretation of data. 

On the television show Good Morning America, Quintin Bowles, professor of mechanical engineering at the University of Missouri–Kansas City, claimed in 1996 to have successfully replicated the Patterson power cell. In the book Voodoo Science, Bowles is quoted as having stated: "It works, we just don't know how it works".

A replication has been attempted at Earthtech, using a CETI supplied kit. They were not able to replicate the excess heat. They looked for cold fusion products, but only found traces of contamination in the electrolyte.

References

Further reading
 Bailey, Patrick and Fox, Hal (October 20, 1997). A review of the Patterson Power Cell. Retrieved November 19, 2011. An earlier version of this paper appears in: Energy Conversion Engineering Conference, 1997; Proceedings of the 32nd Intersociety Energy Conversion Engineering Conference. Publication Date: Jul 27 – Aug 1, 1997. Volume 4, pages 2289–2294. Meeting Date: July 27, 1997 – January 8, 1997. Location: Honolulu, HI, USA. 
 Ask the experts, "What is the current scientific thinking on cold fusion? Is there any possible validity to this phenomenon?", Scientific American, October 21, 1999,(Patterson is mentioned on page 2). Retrieved December 5, 2007

Chemical equipment
Electrochemistry
Electrolysis
Fringe physics
Cold fusion